Fjaler is a municipality in the county of Vestland, Norway. It is located in the traditional district of Sunnfjord. The administrative centre is the village of Dale. Other places in Fjaler include Espedal, Flekke, Folkestad, Guddal, and Hellevika.

Fjaler was the birthplace of famous Norwegian poet Jakob Sande. The UWC Red Cross Nordic at Haugland, one of the eighteen United World Colleges of the world is also located here, as well as the Nordic Art Centre at Dalsåsen. There is a bridge connecting Dale to Eikenes in Askvoll municipality, and buses depart from Dale to Førde, Rysjedalsvika, Hyllestad, and the western part of Fjaler.

The  municipality is the 234th largest by area out of the 356 municipalities in Norway. Fjaler is the 230th most populous municipality in Norway with a population of 2,901.

General information

Ytre Holmedal was established as a municipality on 1 January 1838 (see formannskapsdistrikt law). The original municipality was identical to the Ytre Holmedal parish (prestegjeld) with the sub-parishes of Holmedal, Dale, and Fjaler. In 1912, the name Ytre Holmedal was changed to Fjaler.

On 1 January 1990, some changes were made to the boundaries between the municipalities of Fjaler, Gaular, and Askvoll. The areas surrounding the villages of Fure, Folkestad, and Våge (population: 482) in Askvoll were transferred to Fjaler municipality. The areas surrounding the villages of Vårdal, Holmedal, Rivedal, and a part of Hestad (population: 731) in Fjaler were transferred to Askvoll municipality. The parts of Hestad that did not go to Askvoll (population: 90) were transferred to Gaular municipality.

On 1 January 2020, the municipality became part of the newly created Vestland county after Sogn og Fjordane and Hordaland counties were merged.

Name
The name originally belonged to the fjord (now called the Dalsfjorden). The name is probably the plural form of Old Norse fjǫl (fjalir, earlier fjalar), which means "board". The old name was revived in 1913; before then the name of the municipality was Ytre Holmedal.

Coat of arms
The coat of arms was granted on 8 February 1991. The arms show two grey bridges on a red background. The two bridges represent the old, historic bridges in the municipality that are part of the old post road that goes through Fjaler on its way to Trondheim.

Churches
The Church of Norway has one parish within the municipality of Fjaler. It is part of the Sunnfjord prosti (deanery) in the Diocese of Bjørgvin.

Government
All municipalities in Norway, including Fjaler, are responsible for primary education (up to and including 10th year), outpatient health services, senior citizen services, unemployment and other social services, zoning, economic development, and municipal roads. The municipality is governed by a municipal council of elected representatives, which in turn elect a mayor.  The municipality falls under the Sogn og Fjordane District Court and the Gulating Court of Appeal.

Municipal council
The municipal council  of Fjaler is made up of 23 representatives that are elected to four year terms. The party breakdown of the council is as follows:

Mayor
The mayor  of a municipality in Norway is a representative of the majority party or a majority coalition of the municipal council who is elected to lead the council. Kjetil Høgseth Felde of the Liberal Party was elected mayor in the 2019 elections. Leif Jarle Espedal of the Labour Party holds the post of vice mayor.

The mayors of Fjaler (incomplete list):
2019–present: Kjetil Høgseth Felde (Sp)
2015–2019: Gunhild Berge Stang (V)
2003-2015: Arve Helle (Ap)
2002-2003: Jan Ulltang (Sp)
1995-2002: Arne Kyrkjebø (Ap)
1990-1995: Rasmus Felde (Sp)
1988-1989: Magnar Vagstad (Ap)
1982-1987: Kåre Kleppe (Sp)

Geography
Fjaler municipality lies to the south of the Dalsfjord in the Sunnfjord region. The municipality of Askvoll lies to the north (across the fjord), the municipality of Sunnfjord lies to the northeast, the municipality of Høyanger lies to the southeast, and the municipalities of Hyllestad and Solund lie to the southwest.

Notable people 
 Nikka Vonen (1836 in Dale – 1933) a Norwegian educator, folklorist and author
 Haldis Halvorsen (1889 in Dale – 1936) a Norwegian mezzo-soprano opera singer
 Erik Grant Lea (1892–1979) a mythical tycoon and Norwegian ship-owner, banker, insurer and mill owner;  settled in Gjølanger in Fjaler in 1922 
 Jakob Sande (1906 in Dale – 1967) a Norwegian writer, poet and folk singer; wrote in Nynorsk
 Herbjørn Sørebø (1933 in Fjaler – 2003) a Norwegian journalist and broadcasting personality

Gallery

References

External links
Municipal fact sheet from Statistics Norway 
Map of Fjaler

 
Municipalities of Vestland
1838 establishments in Norway